The Olney Support Center, formerly the Olney Federal Support Center, is an underground facility of the Carderock Division of the U.S. Naval Surface Warfare Center (NSWC) located in Montgomery County, Maryland, United States. The NSWC acquired the facility from the Federal Emergency Management Agency (FEMA) in March 2019.

Prior to its acquisition by the NSWC, the center was a communications, satellite teleregistration and data network facility. It at one time housed the FEMA Alternate Operations Center (FAOC) as a control center for the U.S. National Warning System. It was also part of the FEMA National Radio System (FNARS), a high-frequency radio network that links FEMA's emergency operations centers.

References

Olney, Maryland
Federal Emergency Management Agency
Nuclear bunkers in the United States
Subterranea of the United States
Buildings and structures in Montgomery County, Maryland
Continuity of government in the United States
Disaster preparedness in the United States
Systems command installations of the United States Navy
Government buildings in Maryland